Julia(s) is a 2022 French romantic drama film written and directed by Olivier Treiner. The film stars Lou de Laâge and Dylan Raffin.

Cast
 Lou de Laâge
 Dylan Raffin
 Esther Garrel

Production
The film began principal photography on March 1, 2021 and expect to conclude on May 1, 2021 in Paris, France.

References

External links
 

2022 romantic drama films
French romantic drama films